The following is an incomplete List of Ottoman Calligraphers:

15th–16th century

Hâfiz Osman
Seyyid Kasim Gubari
Ahmed Karahisari
Sheikh Hamdullah
 Kahdi Mahmud Efendi (d. 1575) 
 Ahmed Pasa (d. 1611) son of Kahdi Mahmud Efendi
 Mustafa Ali (d. 1600)
 Yûsuf Efendi (d. 1611)
 Abdullah Amâsi- 16th-century calligrapher
 Ahmed Şemseddin Karahisarî  (d. 963/1556)
 Gâbârî Adurrahman (d. 974/1566)
 Rizâî Mahmud Baba Efendi (d. 987/1579)
 Mustafa Dede – son of Sheikh Hamdullah (d. 945/1538)
 Tâcîzâde Ca'fer Çelebi (1452–1515) poet, calligrapher and scholar
 Ibrahim Vahdi (d. 1714)

17th–18th century

Ibrahim Afif (d. 1767)
Egrikapili Mehmed Rasim Efendi
İsmail Zühdi Efendi
Mehmed Esad Yesari
 Mehmed Rasim (1687–1755)
Mustafa Kutahi (d. after 1785)
Musa al-'Abidi
Yesarizade Mustafa Izzet Efendi
Derviş Ali
Veliyyuddin Efendi
 Mehmed Refi Efendi (d. 1769)
Abdul Rahman Hilmi  (d. 1805) 
Yedikuleli Seyyid 'Abdullah Efendi (d. 1731)
Suyolcuzade Mustafa Eyyubi (1619–1686)
Mahmud Celaleddin Efendi (c. 1750–1829)
Esmâ Ibret Hanim (b. 1780) wife of Mahmud Celâleddin Efendi
 Halid Erzurumi (d. 1651)
 Dede Mehmed Efendi (d. 1734)
 Şâbanzâde Mehmed Efendi(d. 1120/1708)
 Dede Mehmed Efendi (d. 1147/1734)
 Adülbâkî -i Tebrîzî (d. 1039/1629-30)
 Kâtibzâde Mehmed Refî (d. 1183/1769)
 Hasan Üsküdârî (d. 1023/1614)
 Hüseyin Hablî (d. 1157/1744)
 İbrâhim Rodosî (d. 1201/1787)
 Eski İsmâil Zühdü (d. 1144/1731)
 Eğrikapılı Mehmed Râsim (d. 1169/1756)
 Ramazan b. İsmâil رمضان بن إسماعيل (d. 1091/1680)
 Tophâneli Mahmued Nûri,(d. 1080/1669)

19th–20th century

 Ali Alparslan  (1925–2006)
 Şefik Bey (Mehmed Şefik, 1819–1880)
 Abdullah Zuhudi Effendi (1835–1879)
 Muhsinzade Abdullah Bey (1832–1899)
 Hasan Çelebi (b. 1937)
 Hasan Riza Effendi (1849–1920)
Kazasker Mustafa Izzet Efendi
Mehmed Şevkî Efendi (1829–1887) 
 Mehmet Şefik (1818–1890)
Mehmed Sami Efendi (1838–1912)
Hattat Aziz Efendi
Mustafa Râkim
Kayışzâde Hâfız Osman Efendi

Necmeddîn Okyay (Necmeddîn Üsküdari Efendi, 1883–1976) :tr:Necmeddin Okyay
Bakkal Arif Efendi
Kâmil Akdik
Neyzen Emîn Efendi
Halîm Özyazıcı (1898–1964)
 Bekir Pektin (b. 1913)
Hamid Aytaç
 Ismail Hakkı Altunbezer (1873–1946)
 Mustafa Râkim (Mustafa Raq'im, 1757–1826)
 Çömez Mustafa Vasif (d. 1853)
 Hafız Hasan Tahsin Hilmi Efendi (1847–1912)
 Mustafa Halim Özyazici (alternate spelling: Oyazici) (1898–1964)
 Mustafa Uğur Derman (b. 1935)
 Hafız Mehmed Fehmi Efendi (1860–1915)
 Abdülkadir Şürki Efendi 19th-century calligrapher
 Şeref Adkik (1899–1972)
 Şeyh Ali Bedevî (1868–1943)
 Şeref Akdik (1899–1972)
 Hasan Rizâ Efendi (d. 1890)
 Esad Muhis Paşa (1780–1850)
 Mehmed Hâşim Efendi (d. 1845)
 Mehmed Nazif Bey (1846–1913)
 Kebecizâde Mehmed Vasfi, (d. 1831)
 Çemşîr Hâfız Sâlîh Efendi, (d. 1236/1820–21)
 Laz Ömer Efendi (d. 1240/1825)
 Mehmed Şevket Vahdetî (1833–1871)

References

See also
 Calligraphy
 Culture of the Ottoman Empire
 Islamic calligraphy
 Ottoman art